Ugur or Uqur (dU.GUR) was a god worshiped in various parts of the Ancient Near East. He was connected with the Mesopotamian deity Nergal. Much like him, he was associated with war and death. He was also originally regarded as Nergal's sukkal (attendant deity). 

Since the logographic writing of his name could be used to represent Nergal, it is a matter of debate which attestations of dU.GUR in texts refer to him.

Character
Ugur was originally the sukkal of Nergal, though he was replaced in this role by Ishum after the Old Babylonian period. In Mesopotamian sources his name was used to logographically represent the name of Nergal at least from the Middle Babylonian period onward. Volkert Haas regards the origin and meaning of his name as unknown. It has been proposed that it was the imperative form of Akkadian nāqaru, meaning "destroy!"  A lexical text explains his name as synonymous with the Akkadian word namsaru, "sword." Wilfred G. Lambert proposed that he was imagined as a personification of Nergal's weapon.

Due to epithets such as "the bloody Ugur" it is assumed that he was a god of death. Under the name Šaum(m)atar he formed a triad of war gods with Nupatik and Aštabi. It has been proposed that this epithet was derived from an Indo-European language, and that it might be cognate with Sanskrit somadhara (Milky Way) or soma-dhana ("containing soma"). However, it was evidently in use chiefly in some of the Hurrian-speaking areas. 

In Hittite sources the logogram dU.GUR could represent Šulinkatte, a war god of Hattian origin described as having the appearance of a young man. However, he was also sometimes represented by the logogram dZA.BA4.BA4.

Worship
It is possible that Ugur is already present in the Early Dynastic Mesopotamian god list from Abu Salabikh. In later periods he was worshiped in the temples Emeslamnigurru (Sumerian: "E-Meslam which is clad in terror;" E-Meslam being the temple of Nergal in Kutha) in Girsu, Esulim-Enlile ("house of the awesome radiance of Enlil") located in the same city, and in a temple in Isin whose name is presently unknown. While Isin was mostly the cult center of the medicine goddess Ninisina, it was also associated with a number of underworld gods, including Nergal, Ningishzida and an otherwise unknown most likely cthtonic goddess Lakupittu who according to Andrew R. George was likely the tutelary deity of Lagaba near Kutha.

Ugur was introduced from Mesopotamia to the pantheons of other areas of ancient Near East. He was one of the deities celebrated in the  festival from the Hurrian kingdom of Kizzuwatna. He is also attested in personal names from Nuzi, which indicates he was worshiped in eastern Hurrian areas as well.  proposes that figure number 27 from the Yazılıkaya reliefs, placed between a pair of bull-men separating earth and heaven and the mountain god Pišaišapḫi might be Ugur.

In ancient Anatolia Ugur was venerated in Hayaša. On occasion, Ugur and "Ugur of Hayaša" could appear as two distinct deities in Hittite offering lists. The dyad of Ugurs were seemingly regarded as protective deities of the house. Other Anatolian locations where he was worshiped include Hattusa, where priests in his service are attested, and Kaitana, where a festival was dedicated to him.

In Emar a god whose name was written with the logogram dU.GUR appears in rituals alongside Shuwala, a Hurrian goddess connected with the underworld. dU.GUR from Emar has been interpreted as the logographic writing of either the name of Nergal or Resheph, though it is also possible it is meant to be read as Ugur, as a syllabic spelling of this name is known from Hurrian texts from both Emar and Nuzi. While no evidence for the existence of a temple dedicated to him in this city is known. he is mentioned in instructions for the kissu festival of Dagan, which most likely took place in Šatappi, a city possibly located further south. During this celebration, songs dedicated to him and Shuwala were sung. The precise meaning of the term kissu remains uncertain, making the nature of these celebrations, and roles of specific deities in them, difficult to ascertain. It has been proposed that the presence of underworld deities - Ugur and Shuwala - indicates that it represented the periodic death and return to life of a deity, possibly Dagan's spouse, but this remains speculative. It is also possible that it involved abi, offering pits connected to the cult of underworld deities.

Volkert Haas assumes that "Lord of Hubshal" or "Nergal of Hubshal" known from Tell Leilan might be the same deity as Ugur. However, Wouter Henkelman identifies this deity as the Elamite god Simut.

References

Bibliography

Mesopotamian gods
Hurrian deities
Hittite deities
Death gods
War gods
Mesopotamian underworld